Paninsky (masculine), Paninskaya (feminine), or Paninskoye (neuter) may refer to:
Paninsky District, a district of Voronezh Oblast, Russia
Paninsky (inhabited locality) (Paninskaya, Paninskoye), several rural localities in Russia